The 1990 Cincinnati Bengals season was the franchise's 23rd year in professional football and its 21st with the National Football League (NFL). The Bengals won the AFC Central division for the second time in three seasons.

The Bengals would finish the season 9–7 and make the playoffs, defeating the Oilers in the Wild Card round but losing to the Raiders in the divisional round. The Bengals would not make the playoffs again until the 2005 season and would not win a playoff game again until their Super Bowl-appearing 2021 season beginning what eventually became an 8-game playoff losing streak, tied with the Detroit Lions for longest in NFL history.

Offseason

NFL draft

Personnel

Staff

Roster

Regular season

Schedule

Game summaries

Week 1 vs Jets

Week 2

Week 13

Week 17 vs Browns

Standings

Best performances
 James Brooks, December 23, 1990, 201 rushing yards vs. Houston Oilers

Playoffs

Schedule

Team leaders

Passing

Rushing

Receiving

Defensive

Kicking and punting

Special teams

Awards and records

All-Pros
 Anthony Muñoz LT, 1st Team All-Pro

All-Rookies
 James Francis OLB, PFWA All-Rookie Team

Records
 Boomer Esiason, franchise record, most passing yards in one game, 490 yards (achieved on October 7, 1990)

Milestones
 James Brooks, 1st 200 yard rushing game, December 23, 1990, 201 rushing yards vs. Houston Oilers 
 James Brooks, 3rd 1000 yard rushing season (1,004 yards)

References

External links
 1990 Cincinnati Bengals at Pro-Football-Reference.com

Cincinnati Bengals
Cincinnati Bengals seasons
AFC Central championship seasons
Cincin